Maplewood Cemetery is a historic cemetery on Pleasant Street in Marlborough, Massachusetts.  Established in 1864, the  cemetery is the city's eighth.  It is laid out in a roughly rectilinear manner, departing from the popular rural cemetery movement, which preferred more picturesque but less space-efficient winding paths and roads.  It is the location of a Civil War memorial, placed by the Daughters of the American Revolution.

The cemetery was listed on the National Register of Historic Places in 2004.

See also
National Register of Historic Places listings in Marlborough, Massachusetts

References

Cemeteries on the National Register of Historic Places in Massachusetts
Cemeteries in Marlborough, Massachusetts
National Register of Historic Places in Middlesex County, Massachusetts